A list of British films released in 1938.

1938

See also
 1938 in British music
 1938 in British television
 1938 in the United Kingdom

References

External links
 

1938
Films
Lists of 1938 films by country or language
1930s in British cinema